Bom Bom Bom may refer to:

"Bom Bom Bom", a song by Living Things from their 2005 album Ahead of the Lions
"Bom Bom Bom", a song by Roy Kim from his 2013 album Love Love Love
"Bom, Bom, Bom, Bom, Esso Blue!", an Esso advertising song from the 1950s through to the 1970s

See also
"Bom Bom", a 2012 song by Sam and the Womp